Проклятье морей (Curse of the Seas) is the thirteenth studio album by Russian heavy metal band Ария (Aria), released on 13 November 2018.

Track listing

Clips
To Kill the Dragon (2019)

Personnel

Aria
Mikhail Zhitnyakov - Vocals
Vladimir Holstinin - Guitar
Sergey Popov - Guitar
Vitaly Dubinin - Bass
Maxim Udalov - Drums

Others
Roy Z - Producer, Mixing
 Maor Appelbaum - Mastering Engineer
Margarita Pushkina - Lyrics 
Igor Lobanov - Lyrics
Alexander Yelin - Lyrics
Vladislav Tarasov - Lyrics

References

2018 albums
Aria (band) albums
Albums produced by Roy Z